In mathematics, Lazard's universal ring is a ring introduced by Michel Lazard in  over which the universal commutative one-dimensional formal group law is defined.

There is a universal commutative one-dimensional formal group law over a universal commutative ring defined as follows.  We let

be

for indeterminates , and we define the universal ring R to be the commutative ring generated by the elements , with the relations that are forced by the associativity and commutativity laws for formal group laws. More or less by definition, the ring R has the following universal property:
For every commutative ring S, one-dimensional formal group laws over S correspond to ring homomorphisms from R to S.

The commutative ring R constructed above is known as Lazard's universal ring. At first sight it seems to be incredibly complicated: the relations between its generators are very messy. However Lazard proved that it has a very simple structure: it is just a polynomial ring (over the integers) on generators of degree 1, 2, 3, ..., where  has degree .   proved that the coefficient ring of complex cobordism is naturally isomorphic as a graded ring to Lazard's universal ring. Hence, topologists commonly regrade the Lazard ring so that  has degree , because the coefficient ring of complex cobordism is evenly graded.

References

Algebraic topology
Algebraic groups
Algebraic number theory